John Callahan House, known previously as Pinkney-Callahan House when it was located on St. John Street, is a historic home in Annapolis, Maryland, United States. The brick home was constructed by John Callahan (c. 1754–1803), a prominent and wealthy Annapolitan who served as the Register of the Western Shore Land Office between 1778 and 1803, around 1785–90.  It has been moved twice in efforts to prevent its demolition. In 1900–01, the house was relocated to St. John's Street and then to its present site on Conduit Street in 1972. The home features an unusual gable-end principal façade and a largely intact Georgian/Federal interior finishes.  It once served as St. John's College Infirmary.

It was first listed on the National Register of Historic Places on November 12, 1971 (NRHP Reference Number 71000365); after its relocation in 1972, it was listed again in 1973. It is a contributing property in the Colonial Annapolis Historic District.

References

External links
, including undated photo, at Maryland Historical Trust
National Register of Historical Places - MARYLAND (MD), Anne Arundel County

Houses completed in 1785
Georgian architecture in Maryland
Houses on the National Register of Historic Places in Maryland
Houses in Annapolis, Maryland
Relocated buildings and structures in Maryland
National Register of Historic Places in Annapolis, Maryland
Historic district contributing properties in Maryland